Sonia Lawrence (born 19 January 1980) is a British gymnast. She competed in five events at the 1996 Summer Olympics.

References

External links
 

1980 births
Living people
British female artistic gymnasts
Olympic gymnasts of Great Britain
Gymnasts at the 1996 Summer Olympics
Sportspeople from Caerphilly
Commonwealth Games medallists in gymnastics
Commonwealth Games silver medallists for Wales
Gymnasts at the 1994 Commonwealth Games
Medallists at the 1994 Commonwealth Games